Dandurand is a surname. Notable people with the surname include:

Joseph A. Dandurand (21st century), Canadian poet, playwright, and archaeologist
Léo Dandurand (1889–1964), American ice hockey coach and businessman
Raoul Dandurand (1861–1942), Canadian politician and organizer